Paolo Alesandro Espino Alonso (born January 10, 1987), is a Panamanian professional baseball pitcher for the Washington Nationals of Major League Baseball (MLB). He has played in MLB for the Milwaukee Brewers and Texas Rangers.

Career

Cleveland Indians
Espino attended The Pendleton School in Bradenton, Florida. The Cleveland Indians selected him in the 10th round of the 2006 Major League Baseball draft. Espino began his professional career in 2007 with the Single-A Lake County Captains. He split the 2008 season between Lake County and the advanced Single-A Kinston Indians, registering a 5.54 ERA with 68 strikeouts between the two teams. In 2009, Espino appeared with Lake County, Kinston, and the Double-A Akron Aeros, notching a 11–8 record and 3.01 ERA in 28 games between the three clubs. In 2010, Espino spent the majority of the season in Akron, but also appeared in 7 games for the Triple-A Columbus Clippers. Espino split the 2011 season between Columbus and Akron, pitching to a cumulative 2.77 ERA and 8–1 record. He spent the 2012 season in Akron, with the exception of 2 games played for Columbus, registering a 3.29 ERA and 7–4 record between the two. In 2013, he spent his fourth straight year split between Columbus and Akron, pitching to a 6–11 record and 4.72 ERA with 141 strikeouts. On November 4, 2013, Espino elected free agency.

Chicago Cubs
On November 18, 2013, Espino signed a minor league contract with the Chicago Cubs organization. Espino was released by the Cubs before the season began on March 27, 2014.

Washington Nationals
On April 10, 2014, Espino signed a minor league contract with the Washington Nationals organization and was assigned to the Double-A Harrisburg Senators to begin the season. He spent the season in Harrisburg, making one start for the Triple-A Syracuse Chiefs along the way, recording a cumulative 3.84 ERA and 6–5 record. He spent the majority of the 2015 season with Syracuse, also appearing in 8 games for Harrisburg, pitching to a 3.47 ERA with 120 strikeouts. Espino was invited to Spring Training with the Nationals in 2016. However, he did not make the major league club and was assigned to Syracuse, where he pitched to an 8–11 record and 3.30 ERA in 26 games. On November 7, 2016, Espino elected free agency.

Milwaukee Brewers
On November 10, 2016, Espino signed a minor league contract with the Milwaukee Brewers. On May 19, 2017, the Brewers selected Espino's contract to the active roster. Espino made his major league debut for the Brewers that day against the Chicago Cubs. Espino was designated for assignment by the Brewers on August 23, 2017, to make room on the 40-man roster for Aaron Brooks, who was claimed off waivers. In 17.2 innings for the Brewers in 2017, Espino allowed 12 earned runs and notched 13 strikeouts.

Texas Rangers
He was traded to the Rangers on August 26, 2017 for cash considerations and was assigned to the Triple-A Round Rock Express. He pitched 6.1 innings for Texas in 2017, allowing 3 earned runs and notching 7 strikeouts. On October 10, 2017, Espino was outrighted off of the 40-man roster. He elected free agency on November 6, 2017. On December 22, 2017, Espino re-signed with the Rangers on a minor league contract. He was released on April 19, 2018.

Second stint with Brewers
On May 1, 2018, Espino signed a minor league deal with the Milwaukee Brewers. He spent the remainder of the season with the Triple-A Colorado Springs Sky Sox before electing free agency on November 2, 2018.

Second stint with Nationals
On January 15, 2019, Espino signed a minor league deal with the Washington Nationals. He was assigned to AAA Fresno Grizzlies to start the 2019 season, where he spent the entire year. In 2020 he was invited to Spring Training with the Nationals, and was added to their initial 60-man player pool. On September 21, 2020, Espino was selected to the 40-man and active rosters. In 2020 for the Nationals, Espino appeared in 2 games, allowing 3 earned runs in 6.0 innings with 7 strikeouts. Espino was outrighted to the minor leagues on October 9, 2020, and elected free agency the next day.

Espino re-signed with the Nationals on a minor league contract on November 2, 2020. On April 18, 2021, Espino was selected to the active roster after Stephen Strasburg was placed on the injured list. On June 16, 2021, Espino won his first major league game, pitching five shutout innings in a 3–1 win over the Pittsburgh Pirates. On June 23, 2021, he earned his first major league save by pitching a scoreless bottom of the ninth inning in a 13–12 win against the Philadelphia Phillies.

Personal
Espino's cousin Damaso is a former professional baseball player, and is currently an international scout in the St. Louis Cardinals organization. The two were on Panama's roster for the 2009 World Baseball Classic.

References

External links

Paolo Espino at Pura Pelota (Venezuelan Professional Baseball League)

1987 births
Living people
Akron Aeros players
Caribes de Anzoátegui players
Colorado Springs Sky Sox players
Columbus Clippers players
Fresno Grizzlies players
Harrisburg Senators players
Kinston Indians players
Lake County Captains players
Major League Baseball pitchers
Major League Baseball players from Panama
Milwaukee Brewers players
Panamanian expatriate baseball players in the United States
Round Rock Express players
Sportspeople from Panama City
Syracuse Chiefs players
Texas Rangers players
Toros del Este players
Panamanian expatriate baseball players in the Dominican Republic
Tiburones de La Guaira players
Panamanian expatriate baseball players in Venezuela
Washington Nationals players
2006 World Baseball Classic players
2009 World Baseball Classic players
Panamanian emigrants to the United States
IMG Academy alumni